The Union County School District is a school district headquartered in Lake Butler, Union County, Florida, United States. It serves Union County.

The schools in this district are:

References

External links

 

School districts in Florida
Union County, Florida